The following lists events that happened during 1949 in South Africa.

Incumbents
 Monarch: King George VI.
 Governor-General and High Commissioner for Southern Africa: Gideon Brand van Zyl.
 Prime Minister: Daniel François Malan.
 Chief Justice: Ernest Frederick Watermeyer.

Events

January
 13,14 – Durban riots against Indians
June
 29 – South Africa introduces its apartheid policy.

July
 1 – The Prohibition of Mixed Marriages Act, 1949, Act No. 55 of 1949, is passed.

October
 30 – Ben Schoeman announces in Johannesburg that the NP would carry the apartheid policy through "notwithstanding what serious economic problems it might cause".

November
 1 – Seretse Khama and his British wife Ruth Williams Khama are declared forbidden in South Africa.

December
 16 – The Voortrekker Monument is officially inaugurated in Pretoria.

Unknown date
 The University of Pretoria establishes the Graduate School of Management (GSM), the first MBA programme to be launched outside of North America.
 The South African Post Office begins to force Europeans and non-Europeans to stand in separate queues in post offices and serve them at different counters.

Births
 27 January – Nkosazana Dlamini-Zuma, politician.
 29 January – Eugene de Kock, South African Police colonel and assassin.
 8 April – Fanie de Jager, operatic tenor.
 29 April – Pravin Gordhan, national minister
 23 May – Estian Calitz, academic.
 2 June – Michael Lapsley, Anglican priest and activist.
 17 July – Bill Faure, film director. (d. 1994)
 19 July – Kgalema Motlhanthe, politician, former President of South Africa.
 23 July – Clive Rice, cricketer. (d. 2015)
 21 October – Morne du Plessis, Springboks captain & rugby administrator.
 24 November – Neall Ellis, helicopter pilot and mercenary.
 28 November – Nosimo Balindlela, politician.

Deaths
 4 May – Hendrik Adolph Mulder, poet and Afrikaans literary critic.

Railways

Locomotives
 The South African Railways places the first of one hundred Class 24 2-8-4 Berkshire type branchline steam locomotives in service, most of them on the South West Africa System.

Sport

7.1 Golf
 Bobby Locke tied with Harry Bradshaw (Ireland) both scored 283 (−5).Bobby Locke then won the 36 holes play-off by 12 shots. British Open championship. Royal St. Georges Golf Club. Sandwich. 6–9 July 1949.

7.2 Tennis
 Eric Sturgess & Sheila Summers became the South Africa's first Wimbledon champions when they beat John Bromwich (Australia) & Louis Brough (USA), 8–7, 9–11, 7–5, to win the mixed doubles final.
 Eric Sturgess was awarded the Helms Trophy as the best athlete of the African continent.

References

South Africa
Years in South Africa
History of South Africa